is a Prefectural Natural Park in Fukuoka Prefecture, Japan. Established in 1965, the park spans the municipalities of Fukuoka, Itoshima, and Nakagawa.

See also
 National Parks of Japan
 Sefuri-Kitayama Prefectural Natural Park
 List of Places of Scenic Beauty of Japan (Fukuoka)

References

Parks and gardens in Fukuoka Prefecture
Protected areas established in 1965
1965 establishments in Japan
Fukuoka